Donald Hugh Clarke (born 15 May 1926) is an English cricketer. He played two first-class matches for Cambridge University Cricket Club in 1946.

See also
 List of Cambridge University Cricket Club players

References

External links
 

1926 births
Possibly living people
English cricketers
Cambridge University cricketers
People from Bromborough